Three ships of the United States Navy have been named USS Manley for John Manley.

, was a torpedo boat purchased in 1898, served in the Spanish–American War, left active service in 1914, renamed Levant in 1918 and sold in 1920.

United States Navy ship names